Vasileios "Vasilis" Leventis (born 2 November 1951) is a Greek politician, leader of the Greek centrist party, Union of Centrists since 1992 and former Member of Parliament, in office 2015 to 2019.

Early life
Vassilis Leventis is the fourth child of Apostolos and Gregoria Leventis who were originally from Korakovouni, a small village in Arcadia. The Leventis family moved to Piraeus where Vassilis Leventis graduated from high school and in 1969 he was admitted as the 6th highest-ranking candidate, to the Civil Engineering department of the National Technical University of Athens. During the '70s he ventured into discography, himself funding and producing a one time record.

His first involvement with politics occurred in 1975 when, as an assistant of the then dean of the Athens Polytechnic University, Kyprianos Biris, he contributed in composing articles 21 and 24 of the Greek Constitution and also participated in forming the DEPOS project.

He is fluent in German and has adequate understanding of the English language.

Political career
Vassilis Leventis started his political career in 1974 as a founding father and later MP candidate of PASOK. After 1981, he expressed many disagreements with the party, blaming it for a divergence from its original views. In 1982, he was a candidate for mayor of Piraeus.

In 1984, he founded the first ecological party in Greece, which participated in the European Elections of the same year, gaining only 0.15% of the vote.

In 1986, he stood for the office of mayor of Athens gaining 0.57% of the vote.

In the national legislative election of 1989, he was a candidate with the New Democracy party but failed to get elected.

In 1990, he founded the television channel Channel 67, which was renamed in 1993 to Channel 40: Social and Ecological Television of Greece due to transfer of the channel's frequency to 40 UHF. The channel was sold in late 2000 to publisher George Kouris, and was then renamed Extra Channel on January 8, 2001; it was later sold again to entrepreneur Phillip Vriones and was renamed Extra Channel 3 in August 2003. Leventis himself hosted from 2000 until 2016 a political show on the channel, titled Politikos Marathonis, which was broadcast on a weekly basis.

In a 1992 congress, he decided to found the Union of Centrists, which strove to become "the political continuance of the centrist expression in Greece". Leventis aimed to become part of the legacy of some great politicians of the past, such as Eleftherios Venizelos and Georgios Papandreou. However, until 2015, the party's influence was marginal, with 1.79% of the total vote in the January 2015 legislative election being its highest share, not securing entry to parliament. In the September 2015 legislative election the party cleared the 3% threshold in the Greek parliament after it won 186,457 votes (3.43%), electing 9 MPs.

Political views
Vasilis Leventis expresses his political opinion through his Antidiaplokí (Αντιδιαπλοκή, anti-corruption) quarterly newspaper and his TV show that has been hosted in several stations so far, such as PellaTV and Extra Channel.

His views are placed in the center of the political spectrum with particular emphasis on policies that are "rational", transparent, squarely opposed to corruption, in favor of the weaker social classes (workers, pensioners, farmers, single parents, etc.), hostile to the concentration of power in just a few individuals and reform of the Greek political life.

Leventis himself is unreservedly and nearly polemically critical of mainstream Greek political parties and their leaders. He asserts that Greek politicians are in league with big business interests who control the mainstream media and as a result of this criticism he has been deliberately excluded from publicity, which in his opinion, is the factor that has caused his party to exist only in the margins of Greek politics. His frequent use of expletives and his animated style of speaking have led him often to be the object of jokes at his expense, but have also elevated some snippets of his TV shows to cult status.

Leventis proposes the cutting of double and triple pensions, to cut the pensions of those who have an income of 3,000 euro from other sources, to fire the 1,500 officials of the Parliament and the public workers who do not do their job.

Vassilis Leventis's general public acknowledgment has risen during 2014 and 2015 due to a viral video montage, following his so-called "prophecies", that accurately predict Greece's current financial crisis, from as early as 1993.

Citations and notes

External links
Union of Centrists – Official website

1951 births
Living people
National Technical University of Athens alumni
Ludwig Maximilian University of Munich alumni
Greek MPs 2015–2019
People from Messini